Patrick Mulcahy (24 November 1877 – 27 April 1963) was an Irish hurler. His championship career with the Limerick and Dublin senior teams lasted from 1896 until 1908.

Born in Cappamore, County Limerick, Mulcahy first played competitive hurling in his youth. He was little more than a schoolchild when he was invited to play for the Murroe and Boher teams, however, he quickly established himself on the Cappamore team, winning a Murphy Cup medal in 1897. Mulcahy later played with the Commercials club in Dublin and won five county senior championship medals.

Mulcahy joined the Limerick senior team in 1896 and enjoyed much success during his brief tenure with the team. He was the full-forward on the team that won All-Ireland, Munster and Croke Cup titles in 1897. Mulcahy later joined the Dublin senior team and added a Leinster medal to his collection in 1902. He played his last inter-county match in May 1908.

Honours

Cappamore
Murphy Cup (1): 1897

Commercials
Dublin Senior Hurling Championship (5): 1899, 1905, 1907, 1909, 1916

Limerick
All-Ireland Senior Hurling Championship (1): 1897
Munster Senior Hurling Championship (1): 1897
 Croke Cup (1): 1897

Dublin
Leinster Senior Hurling Championship (1): 1902

References

1877 births
1953 deaths
Cappamore hurlers
Limerick inter-county hurlers
Dublin inter-county hurlers
All-Ireland Senior Hurling Championship winners